The N28 road is a national primary road in  Ireland. It connects the port and village of Ringaskiddy to the N40 South Ring Road in Cork city.

The road begins at the Bloomfield Interchange on the N40 South Ring Road in Rochestown. It runs southwards as Carr’s Hill towards Carrigaline, leaving Cork at the L6467 junction, where it becomes Cork Road. North of Carrigaline, the route passes through the Shannonpark Roundabout and proceeds east through the village of Shanbally to Ringaskiddy.

Prior to the completion of the South Ring, the N28 formed the route from the Bandon Road interchange through the Kinsale Road interchange to where it leaves the N40.

As of 2021, 11 km of motorway was planned on the N28 between Cork and Ringaskiddy, with a final 1.5 km of single carriageway. Following the conclusion of a court challenge, the project was cleared to begin construction in 2021. As of October 2021, "main works" were expected to commence in 2024.

See also
 Roads in Ireland
 Motorways in Ireland
 National secondary road
 Regional road

References

28
Roads in County Cork